Anke Feuchtenberger (born 1963, in East Berlin) is a German artist and cartoonist. 
She studied at the Kunsthochschule Berlin. Since 1997, she has held a professorship for drawing at the Hamburg University of Applied Sciences. She is a mother and grandmother and lives and works in Hamburg and Vorpommern.

See also
 List of German women artists
 Simon Schwartz (artist)

References

External links 
 
Homepage von Anke Feuchtenberger
The Comics of Anke Feuchtenberger & Their Many Expressionisms at the Library of Congress video

1963 births
Living people
20th-century German women artists
21st-century German women artists
Writers from Berlin
German contemporary artists
Academic staff of the Hamburg University of Applied Sciences
German comics artists
German comics writers
German female comics artists
Female comics writers